The 2013 FedEx Cup Playoffs, the series of four golf tournaments that determined the season champion on the U.S.-based PGA Tour, were played from August 22 to September 22. It included the following four events:
The Barclays — Liberty National Golf Club, Jersey City, New Jersey
Deutsche Bank Championship — TPC Boston, Norton, Massachusetts
BMW Championship — Conway Farms Golf Club, Lake Forest, Illinois
Tour Championship — East Lake Golf Club, Atlanta, Georgia

These were the seventh FedEx Cup playoffs since their inception in 2007.

The point distributions can be seen here.

Regular season rankings

The Barclays
The Barclays was played August 22–25. Of the 125 players eligible to play in the event, two did not enter: Zach Johnson (ranked 18) and Steve Stricker (20). Of the 123 entrants, 74 made the second-round cut at 142 (E).

Adam Scott won by one stroke over Graham DeLaet, Justin Rose, Gary Woodland, and Tiger Woods and moved from 11th place to second place in the standings. The top 100 players in the points standings advanced to the Deutsche Bank Championship. This included five players who were outside the top 100 prior to The Barclays: Martin Kaymer (ranked 103rd to 90th), Camilo Villegas (110 to 100), Erik Compton (117 to 94), Greg Chalmers (122 to 93), and Stuart Appleby (123 to 96). Five players started the tournament within the top 100 but ended the tournament outside the top 100, ending their playoff chances: James Driscoll (ranked 93rd to 103rd), Ted Potter Jr. (96 to 105), J. J. Henry (97 to 106), Geoff Ogilvy (99 to 104), and Jeff Overton (100 to 108).

Par 71 course

Deutsche Bank Championship
The Deutsche Bank Championship was played August 30 – September 2. All 100 players eligible to play in the event did so. 76 made the second-round cut at one-under-par, 141.

Henrik Stenson won by two strokes over Steve Stricker and moved into first place in the standings. The top 70 players in the points standings advanced to the BMW Championship. This included seven players who were outside the top 70 prior to the Deutsche Bank Championship: Kevin Stadler (75 to 32), Brian Davis (80 to 49), Ian Poulter (77 to 52), Marc Leishman (76 to 58), Nicholas Thompson (73 to 59), Brendan Steele (89 to 69), and Ernie Els (91 to 70). Seven players started the tournament within the top 70 but ended the tournament outside the top 70, ending their playoff chances: Ryan Palmer (60 to 71), Freddie Jacobson (61 to 72), Martin Laird (63 to 74), David Lingmerth (64 to 75), Kyle Stanley (66 to 77), Cameron Tringale (69 to 79), and Tim Clark (70 to 80).

Par 71 course

BMW Championship
The BMW Championship was played September 12–16, after a one-week break. All 70 players eligible to play in the event did so. There was no cut. The tournament was scheduled to end on September 15 but the final round could not be completed on Sunday due to rain and finished on Monday.

Zach Johnson won by two strokes over Nick Watney. Two players played their way into the Tour Championship: Watney (ranked 34 to ranked 12) and Luke Donald (54 to 29). Two players played their way out of the Tour Championship: Harris English (28 to 31) and Lee Westwood (30 to 41).

The top 30 players in FedEx Cup points after this event advanced to the Tour Championship and also earned spots in the 2014 Masters Tournament, U.S. Open, and (British) Open Championship.

With the FedEx Cup points reset after the BMW Championship, all 30 remaining players had at least a mathematical chance to secure the season crown, and any of the top five players could claim the FedEx Cup with a win in the Tour Championship.

Par 71 course

Reset points
The points were reset after the BMW Championship.

Tour Championship
The Tour Championship was played September 19–22. All 30 golfers who qualified for the tournament played, and there was no cut. Henrik Stenson won the tournament by three shots over Jordan Spieth and Steve Stricker, and the FedEx Cup.

Par 70 course

Final leaderboard

For the full list see here.

Table of qualifying players
Table key:

* First-time Playoffs participant

References

External links
Coverage on the PGA Tour's official site

FedEx Cup
FedEx Cup Playoffs